The Exploited are a Scottish punk rock band from Edinburgh, formed in 1979 by Stevie Ross and Terry Buchan, with Buchan soon replaced by his brother Wattie Buchan. They signed to Secret Records in March 1981, and their debut EP, Army Life, and debut album, Punks Not Dead, were both released that year. The band maintained a large cult following in the 1980s among a hardcore working class punk and skinhead audience. Originally a street punk band, the Exploited eventually became a crossover thrash band with the release of their album Death Before Dishonour in 1987.

Although the Exploited continue to perform live, they have not released any studio material since their last album, Fuck the System, in 2003. Their songs have been covered by Slayer and Ice-T. Despite many lineup changes, Wattie has remained as the Exploited's singer and leader.

Current members
 Wattie Buchan - vocals 1979-present
 Wullie Buchan - drums 1982-1988, 1992-present
 Irish Rob - bass 2004-present
 Steve Campbell - guitars 2020-present

Career

Formation and early days (1979–1980)

The original line-up consisted of Terry Buchan (vocals), Stevie Ross (guitar), Colin Erskine (bass) and Andy McNiven (drums). Formed in the West Granton area of Edinburgh, a large grey council estate on the north side of the city. The band's politics was reflected in its name, coined by drummer and songwriter McNiven, whose father was a Korean War veteran and a Communist. While in the early stages as a band, with little equipment, the band were invited to play their first gig at Craigmuir School. The band seemed to be a victim of their own publicity here. They had spray-painted their band name locally and had stolen Sunday papers, milk, and rolls in the early hours of Sunday morning and redistributed them outside peoples' front door, with a note saying, "a gift from the exploited". Their first gig was on Friday 15 December 1978. The date was recalled by McNiven as it coincided with a performance by the Doomed (the Damned by another name) at Clouds in Edinburgh to which they went after performing their own gig. The gig was attended by Terry's older brother Wattie, who had recently left the army and was a punk in London.

Wattie soon replaced Terry, and Andy McNiven and Colin Erskine were dropped from the line-up as well. Jim Park became the drummer in January 1979, first playing on 3 February 1979 at the YMCA in Edinburgh, (the day after Sid Vicious died in New York City). After a few gigs in and around Edinburgh, Stevey Hay left after an appearance in Aberdeen supporting the UK Subs. A few months later, he and Terry Buchan formed the Exposed. The Exposed split in 1980 after a gig supporting the Exploited. Terry left for London. Stevey was prominent in the Edinburgh band scene during the 1980s. Stevey died 14 July 2013 after a successful career as a blues musician. Obituary: Stevey Hay, musician

Early releases and Punk's Not Dead (1980–1981)

Influenced by 1970s punk rock music such as music by the Sex Pistols, the quartet created a simple, no-frills sound characterised by speed and aggression. In 1980, the group founded its own independent record label, Exploited Records, and released their debut EP Army Life, which was #6 in the Indie/Independent charts for eight weeks, then was in the Top 20 for eighteen months. The B-side was called Fuck the Mods / Crashed Out and the record's back cover stated "To all the Edinburgh punks and skins - keep on mod-bashing!!".

They then released another single, "Barmy Army", which jumped into the independent charts and remained there for 53 weeks, peaking at #4. Their single "Dead Cities" peaked at #31 on the UK Charts. Their single "Exploited Barmy Army" peaked at #4 on the Independent/Indie 

In March 1981, the band signed to Secret Records, and spent a month recording their debut album, Punks Not Dead. The Exploited released the single "Dogs of War", which peaked at #2 in the Independent charts and #63 on the UK Charts. Also in 1981, the band released their first live album, On Stage, recorded during a concert in Edinburgh. Thereafter, the band performed, along with Discharge, Anti-Nowhere League, Anti-Pasti and Chron Gen on a tour called Apocalypse Now, which was recorded and released as a live album. Their album Punks Not Dead, released in April 1981, went to #20 in May, then number 1 on the Independent Charts. During this time, the Exploited appeared on the popular mainstream TV programme,  A lot of fans of the Exploited were unhappy with the band's decision to appear on the show. The hardcore punk band Conflict wrote the song Exploitation about this appearance, which began a long-standing rivalry between Conflict and the Exploited that divided the punk fan base.

Troops of Tomorrow, Let's Start a War, and Horror Epics (1982–1986)
The band released the albums Troops of Tomorrow in 1982, Let's Start a War in 1983 and Horror Epics in 1985. The period between these albums was marked by severe discord over the band's musical direction: guitarist Big John Duncan and bassist Gary McCormack both left to form new bands—"bands with disco beats and guitar solos, total shit", in Wattie's words—and the band went through a rapid succession of drummers, one of whom allegedly left after a "nervous breakdown". The band was driven away from the Secret label by new management who demanded unrealistic changes in style and personnel. Their next label, a tiny enterprise named Pax Records, folded after its owner fled with all its assets.

The concert album Live at the Whitehouse was recorded in Washington, D.C. in 1985 at the 9:30 Club and was released the following year in 1986. They also released the studio EP Jesus Is Dead in 1986, following up with Live and Loud, a videography of the Exploited performing around Europe and in the United States. During the tour of the US, Wattie and Karl Morris had a fight on stage, and Karl left shortly afterwards. He was briefly replaced by Mad Mick, who then disappeared without trace. Nigel Swanson was then appointed as the new guitarist.

Death Before Dishonour, The Massacre and Beat the Bastards (1987–2002)

"Sexual Favours", a single from the album Death Before Dishonour, was released in 1987. The album only ranked in the top 200 of the Britain Alternative Music list. However, the album sold out quickly. The album's cover featured artwork from the American punk artist Pushead, who complained that he was neither paid nor credited for the work.

In 1990, the Exploited released their album The Massacre. The album is a crossover thrash album. The band went on to release a Singles Collection album in 1993. The Exploited also released the videography Live in Japan in 1993. Their album Beat the Bastards was released in April 1996.

Fuck the System and next album (2003–present)
In early 2003, the band released the album Fuck the System on Dream Catcher Records, and in the following year, they toured in the UK and US. On 14 October 2003, about 500 fans started a riot in Montreal, Canada after an Exploited concert was cancelled due to the band not being allowed into the country. Rioters destroyed eight cars and set them on fire; broke eleven shop windows and caused other damage. The band were banned from playing in Mexico City due to the riot.

In a 2012 interview, Wattie Buchan claimed that a new album was being finished. In February 2014, Wattie Buchan suffered a heart attack on stage during a performance in Lisbon on the band's Taste of Chaos Tour with Hatebreed and Napalm Death. He was taken to a hospital, where he was expected to receive treatment for at least a week. The band signed a deal with Nuclear Blast Records, and was to have many of its albums reissued in March 2014. The band had also confirmed that its first album in a decade would be released during the 2010s. It is currently unknown when the album will be released.

In March 2020, Wattie Buchan responded to the coronavirus outbreak that was forcing bands to cancel or postpone tours. He commented by taking a shot at Green Day (a band on many occasions he has admitted to hating) saying "Fuck coronavirus! I have had 5 heart attacks a quad heart bypass and a heart pacemaker fitted. Cancel gigs for a virus? We ain't fucking Green Day piss - We are the real deal. No danger will we be cancelling our upcoming gigs. Punks Not Dead!" The Australian leg of the tour was then cancelled four days later, though the band completed all the scheduled New Zealand gigs.

Legacy
The term "UK 82" came from the Exploited's song "UK 82". AllMusic described the Exploited as "one of most riveting British punk rock units of the early 1980s".

The Exploited have influenced multiple bands such as Metallica, Slayer, Anthrax, Nirvana, Queens of the Stone Age, Discharge, Stormtroopers of Death, Agnostic Front, Exodus, the Virus, Napalm Death, Terrorizer, NOFX, Rancid, Dropkick Murphys, the Casualties, Pennywise, 7 Seconds, Anti-Flag, Blanks 77, Atari Teenage Riot, Death Angel, and Total Chaos.

In the 2007 documentary Punk's Not Dead, both Wattie and Wullie Buchan are interviewed. They are the only two native speakers in the documentary to be given subtitles, as many North Americans struggle to understand the Scots language used.

Musical style and influences
The Exploited has been categorised as crossover thrash, punk rock, thrash metal, speed metal, punk metal, anarchist punk,  street punk and  Originally playing street punk and oi!, the Exploited became a crossover thrash band with their album Death Before Dishonour. The Exploited's influences include Sex Pistols, The Sensational Alex Harvey Band, the Vibrators, the Threats, Alternative, the Belsen Horrors, and Johnny Moped. Wattie Buchan also mentioned being influenced by James Brown and he likes The Cure's first four albums.

Lyrics

The Exploited have been controversial for their aggressive lyrics and rowdy gigs. They were considered "cartoon punks" by Ian Glasper. Glasper wrote: "For many, the Exploited were the quintessential second wave punk band with their senses-searing high-speed outbursts against the system, and wild-eyed frontman Walter 'Wattie' Buchan's archetypal orange mohican." 

The Exploited are known for their lyrics about anarchy, politics and anti-authority. In a 1983 interview, the Exploited said that they were not a political band, but their lyrics became political in the late 1980s and Wattie Buchan said in the documentary Punk's Not Dead that punk is defined by its politics. As a band with lyrics that have anarchist themes, the Exploited's vocalist Wattie Buchan describes himself as an anarchist and openly hates politics. The Exploited have made songs about former British Prime Minister Margaret Thatcher and have expressed a disdainful view towards Thatcher. The Exploited's song "Maggie", a song from the band's album Horror Epics, is about Thatcher. The Exploited's third studio album, "Let's Start a War... (Said Maggie One Day)", focuses on Margaret Thatcher and the Falklands War. Other topics of the album are police-driven riots, war, unemployment and hopelessness. Many songs from the mid-'80s focus on the threat of nuclear war.

The fans of the Exploited were nicknamed the Barmy Army. During the rivalry between the Exploited and Conflict, there were occasional clashes with fans of Conflict, known as "the Conflict Crew". In addition to the anti-social behaviour of the band and some of their fans, the Exploited would often pull out of gigs at short notice in the 1980s, which led many venues to refuse to work with them. After the 1981 Southall riot, Oi! bands in general became associated with racism, and the Exploited were sometimes believed to be a racist band because of Wattie's swastika tattoo, an incident in the early '80s where Wattie fought with a group of Asians in a cafe and in 1985 when "Deptford John" joined from the skinhead band Combat 84. The band has denied all accusations of racism.

As of August 2017, the band's website contains a history of the band that mentions some of the problems that have accompanied their gigs, such as a riot after a gig at the Rainbow in Finsbury Park, London when the Jam were playing nearby and Wattie incited the fans to attack the Mods, and having declared onstage in Argentina that the Falkland Islands are British forever. George Same has written about the fighting after the Finsbury Park gig in his book on modern music, Backward Moddy Boy. In a documentary about the band, former manager Gem Howard said that he would often sneak the band out of hotels late, as they would often vandalise the hotel and steal everything that they could from the rooms.

Timeline

Discography

Punks Not Dead (1981)
Troops of Tomorrow (1982)
Let's Start a War... (Said Maggie One Day) (1983)
Horror Epics (1985)
Death Before Dishonour (1987)
The Massacre (1990)
Beat the Bastards (1996)
Fuck the System (2003)

References

Other sources
Laison, Neil, "Punk of All Colours", The Exploited (2004), pp. 51, 78

Exploited - все о группе, музыка, видео, фото

External links

Official website

Musical groups established in 1979
Musical quartets
Scottish punk rock groups
1979 establishments in Scotland
Crossover thrash groups
British hardcore punk groups
Obscenity controversies in music
Oi! groups
Street punk groups
Musical groups from Edinburgh
Political music groups